Fort Kongenstein was a Danish trading fort located in Ada Foah, Ghana built in 1783. A greater portion of the fort has since been washed away by the sea waves.

Gallery

References

Danish Gold Coast
Kongenstein
Former Danish colonies
Greater Accra Region
Military installations established in 1783
18th century in Ghana